Cornelius Holmboe (17 April 1881 – 16 November 1947) was a Norwegian politician for the Labour Party. He was Minister of Justice in 1928.

Personal life
He was born in Tromsø as the youngest son of physician Johannes Michael Holmboe (1844–1918) and his wife Helga Dybwad (1849–1881). He had several brothers and sisters, and, after the death of his mother, several half-siblings. His grandfather Leonhard Christian Borchgrevink Holmboe was involved in politics, so were his granduncles Even Hammer Holmboe and Hans Holmboe.

In 1907 he married Ingeborg Elieson Dybwad. The couple had two daughters and one son.

Career
Holmboe finished his secondary education in Tromsø in 1898, enrolled in law studies and graduated as cand.jur. in 1903. He then worked as a jurist and newspaper editor, editing Solungen from 1907 to 1908 and Den 1ste Mai from 1908 to 1909. In 1909 he was hired as an attorney in Tromsø. He worked as a defender in the court of appeal from 1915 and the district court from 1923. He was also chairman of the board of the savings bank Tromsøsundets Sparebank from 1924 to 1937.

On 28 January 1928 he was appointed Minister of Justice and the Police in the cabinet Hornsrud. The cabinet Hornsrud was the first Labour Party cabinet in Norway. Fearing widespread socialism in Norway, the other parliamentary parties defeated the cabinet Hornsrud already after eighteen days, in February 1928, on a vote of no confidence. As an effect, Holmboe was not allowed to continue as Minister of Justice.

Cornelius Holmboe later became district stipendiary magistrate (sorenskriver) of Nord-Hedmark, from 1937.

He died in 1947 in Oslo.

References

1881 births
1947 deaths
Government ministers of Norway
Labour Party (Norway) politicians
Politicians from Tromsø
20th-century Norwegian lawyers
Norwegian newspaper editors
Cornelius
Ministers of Justice of Norway